Quasi is a sculpture by New Zealand artist Ronnie van Hout currently located on the roof of City Gallery Wellington. The sculpture, van Hout's unsmiling face on the back of a 5-metre hand, has drawn negative remarks, with replies to the initial tweet announcing the installation of the sculpture on the roof of City Gallery Wellington ranging from "kinda creepy" and "really ugly" to "hideous" and "a Lovecraftian nightmare come to life".

Description

Quasi, named after Quasimodo, the main protagonist of the novel The Hunchback of Notre-Dame and the latin prefix quasi-, meaning "almost" or "as it were", is a sculpture made from polystyrene, steel and resin that depicts van Hout's unsmiling face on the back of a disembodied, 5-metre hand standing on its index and ring fingers. van Hout made the so-called "partial self-portrait" for his hometown of Christchurch after the 2011 Christchurch earthquake. It was eventually installed on the roof of the Christchurch Art Gallery on 9 June 2016 were it stayed for almost 3 years until 26 February 2019. On 19 August 2019, it was moved to the roof of City Gallery Wellington where it's planned to stay for an additional 3 years.

Reception
The sculpture has drawn mixed-to negative reactions from the public, with many on social media describing Quasi as "hideous" and "monstrous". On 25 October 2016, New Zealand art critic, Warren Feeny writing for Stuff.co.nz, penned a list entitled "Ten reasons why Christchurch Art Gallery's Quasi must go" listing his reasons why he feels Quasi should be removed from its then perch on top of the Christchurch Art Gallery with such reasons given as "Quasi is a one-line joke" where he explained that the sculpture was a bit of "fun and mischief" but not much else and "Quasi is in the wrong place" where he expresses his opinion that, had quasi been at ground level at a more human scale it would've "made Quasi a more informal and personal experience."

References

External links
Quasi – Christchurch Art Gallery

Culture in Wellington
Outdoor sculptures in New Zealand